Osama Mohammed El-Aarag (born November 15, 1991) is a Qatari swimmer, who specialized in breaststroke events. At age sixteen, Alarag became one of the youngest swimmers to mark their official debut at the 2008 Summer Olympics in Beijing, competing in the men's 100 m breaststroke. He topped the first heat against Oman's Mohammed Al-Habsi and Cook Islands' Petero Okotai in a lifetime best of 1:10.83. Alarag, however, failed to advance into the semi-finals, as he placed sixty-first out of sixty-five swimmers in the overall rankings.

References

External links
NBC Olympics Profile

1991 births
Living people
Qatari male swimmers
Olympic swimmers of Qatar
Swimmers at the 2008 Summer Olympics
Male breaststroke swimmers
Swimmers at the 2006 Asian Games
People from Doha
Asian Games competitors for Qatar